The 2007 Open de Tenis Comunidad Valenciana was a men's tennis tournament that was part of the International Series of the 2007 ATP Tour. It was the 13th edition of the tournament and was held on outdoor clay courts from 9 April until 15 April 2007. The event was won by Nicolás Almagro in singles and Wesley Moodie & Todd Perry in doubles.

Finals

Singles

 Nicolás Almagro defeated  Potito Starace, 4–6, 6–2, 6–1

Doubles

 Wesley Moodie /  Todd Perry defeated  Yves Allegro /  Sebastián Prieto, 7–5, 7–5

References

External links
 ATP tournament profile